The MP 55 was the first generation of the rubber tired variant of electric multiple units used on Paris's Métro system. The trains were manufactured by a consortium between Renault, Brissonneau et Lotz, and Alstom and operated on Line 11 from 1956 to 1999, when they were replaced by refurbished MP 59 stock from Line 4.

Conception 

After the successful testing of the MP 51 test car on the la voie navette segment (connecting track) between Line 3bis and Line 7bis, the RATP decided to order 71 new train cars to equip Line 11, since the line contained a steep grade. The first train (M.3001-N.4001-AB.5501-M.3002) was delivered beginning on October 1, 1956 and went into service on November 8, 1956, with all 17 trains were in service by October 1957.

Description 

The MP 55 was composed of 4 car trainsets, with three of the cars motorized. Originally, the trains were painted in a light blue livery and contained soft fluorescent lighting. Like many trains during the 1950s, the MP 55 trains contained both first class and second class cars.

The traction equipment used was either electro-pneumatic (EMC) or camshaft electric (Jeumon-Heidmann, or JH) and the braking system used was also of electro-pneumatic type, though a gradual variant was used. In 1967, automatic drive (ATO) was implemented on all trainsets.

Refurbishment and retirement 

In 1977, the trains underwent their mid-life refurbishment and received a darker blue livery similar to that of the MP 73. During the late 1980s, the RATP decided that it was time to retire the MP 55. Because of this, the trains were not repainted in the RATP's current mint green and white livery, however many trains were fitted with the RATP's current logo. The retirement process began in 1995, with the arrival of the newer MP 89CC trains on Line 1, and refurbished MP 59 trainsets from Line 4 gradually replaced all of the MP 55 trainsets. The final train was retired on January 30, 1999, completing the retirement process.

Unlike the Sprague-Thomson, no MP 55 trainset was safeguarded in its entirety; nearly all of them were scrapped after their retirement. Only four cars were preserved, however: two by the RATP (AB.5517 and M.3011), one by Renault (M.3001), and the fourth by a private museum (M.3030).

References 
The information in this article is based on that in its French equivalent.

MP 1955